The City of Dim Faces is a lost 1918 silent film directed by George Melford and starring Sessue Hayakawa. It was produced by Famous Players-Lasky and distributed by Paramount Pictures.

Cast
Sessue Hayakawa – Jang Lung
Doris Pawn – Marcell Matthews
Marin Sais – Elizabeth Mendall
James Cruze – Wing Lung
Winter Hall – Brand Matthews
Togo Yamamoto – Foo Sing
James Wang – Luk Tim Eli
George King – Lee Willie
Larry Steers – Ben Walton

References

External links
 The City of Dim Faces at IMDb.com

1918 films
American silent feature films
Films directed by George Melford
Lost American films
Paramount Pictures films
American black-and-white films
1910s American films